Ridin High is the seventh studio album by the American hip hop duo 8Ball & MJG. The album was released on March 13, 2007, by Bad Boy South. It was originally scheduled for July 2006, under the title Pure American Pimpin''', but was eventually confirmed to be titled Ridin High. The album features guest appearances from Three 6 Mafia, Juvenile, Yung Joc, P Diddy, The Notorious B.I.G., Jazze Pha, 112, & Project Pat. Productions will come from Jazze Pha, Sean Dre, Drumma Boy, Lil Jon, DJ Toomp and Timbaland's protégé Nate "Danja" Hills.

The first single off the album is "Relax and Take Notes", which features The Notorious B.I.G. (containing elements of "Dead Wrong" from his posthumous album Born Again'') and fellow Memphian Project Pat. The second single of the album is called "Cruzin'". Following its release, the album debuted at number eight on the U.S. Billboard 200, selling 50,000 copies in its first week.

Track listing

Credits
 Executive Producer: P Diddy
 Co-Executive Producer: Harve Pierre
 Associate Executive Producer: Conrad "Rad" Dimanche
 A&R: Conrad "Rad" Dimanche and Dewayne "Big Du" Martin
 Project Manager: Gwendolyn Niles
 Marketing: Jason Wiley
 Creative Direction & Design: Abbey Katz
 Photography: Naoto Akeda
 Background Photos: Abbey Katz
 Associate Design: Marsha Porter
 Styling: Shanieke Peru
 Management: Du Drilla

Charts

Weekly charts

Year-end charts

References

2007 albums
8Ball & MJG albums
Albums produced by Bangladesh (record producer)
Albums produced by Danja (record producer)
Albums produced by DJ Toomp
Albums produced by Jazze Pha
Albums produced by Sean Combs
Albums produced by Shawty Redd
Bad Boy Records albums